Kevin Magri (born 10 August 1995) is an Italian footballer who plays as a centre back for Serie D club Cavese 1919.

Career

Chievo
Born in Campobasso, Molise region, Magri started his career at Veneto side Chievo. In July 2014 he was signed by Lumezzane in a temporary deal. On 2 February 2015 Magri and Amedeo Benedetti were signed by Reggina.

Vicenza
On 29 June 2015 Magri was signed by Vicenza in a 4-year contract, with Damir Bartulovič moved to Verona. Magri picked no.15 shirt, vacated by Mattia Filippi who was released. On 31 August 2015 Magri was signed by Paganese in a temporary deal.
Vicenza releases it at the end of the year.

On 17 January 2017 Magri was signed by Taranto on a temporary deal.

On 4 October 2018 he joined to Campobasso.

Serie C
On 24 September 2020 he signed with Matelica.

On 3 August 2021 Magri returned to Campobasso in Serie C.

References

External links
 
 

1995 births
Living people
People from Campobasso
Sportspeople from the Province of Campobasso
Footballers from Molise
Italian footballers
Association football defenders
Serie C players
Serie D players
A.C. ChievoVerona players
F.C. Lumezzane V.G.Z. A.S.D. players
Reggina 1914 players
L.R. Vicenza players
Paganese Calcio 1926 players
Taranto F.C. 1927 players
S.S.D. Città di Campobasso players
Avezzano Calcio players
F.C. Legnago Salus players
S.S. Matelica Calcio 1921 players
A.S.D. Nocerina 1910 players
Cavese 1919 players